Alviano is a town and comune in the province of Terni, Umbria, central Italy.

Among its churches is Santa Maria Assunta in Cielo.

References

Cities and towns in Umbria